is a railway station in the town of Tomika, Kamo District, Gifu Prefecture, Japan, operated by the third sector railway operator Nagaragawa Railway.

Lines

Station layout
Tomika Station has two opposed ground-level side platforms connected by a level crossing. The station is staffed.

Platforms

Adjacent stations

|-
!colspan=5|Nagaragawa Railway

History
Tomika Station was opened on October 5, 1923 as  Operations were transferred from the Japan National Railway (JNR) to the Nagaragawa Railway on December 11, 1986, at which time the station was renamed to its present name

Surrounding area
Tomika Post Office
Hannyuri ruins

See also
 List of Railway Stations in Japan

References

External links

 

Railway stations in Japan opened in 1923
Railway stations in Gifu Prefecture
Stations of Nagaragawa Railway
Tomika, Gifu